Rimba's Island is a preschool children's television series featuring colorful costumed animal characters living in a rainforest. It aired on Fox Kids as part of The Fox Cubhouse starting in 1994.

Characters
 Rimba: a gorilla and leader of the group
 Bakari: crocodile
 Ilana: giraffe
 Ooki : rhinoceros 
 Paquito: lion
 Pria: elephant

Episode list
 Small Packages

Co-executive producer Janice Sonski believed the series to be the first series where all episodes were reviewed and approved of by the National Education Association and the National Parent-Teacher Association.

References

External links
 

1990s American children's television series
1994 American television series debuts
1996 American television series endings
1990s preschool education television series
American preschool education television series
American television shows featuring puppetry
Fox Kids
BBC children's television shows
Nine Network original programming
Television series by DIC Entertainment